Crowe Global, commonly referred to as Crowe, previously Crowe Horwath International, is a multinational professional services network. It is the 9th largest global accounting network in the world by revenue. The network consists of more than 220 firms with over 42,000 employees in 130 countries.

Crowe provides audit, tax, consulting, enterprise risk and financial advisory services. In FY 2018, the network earned a record US$4.3 billion in aggregate revenues.

History 

In 1915, Hungarian immigrants Ernest and Edmund Horwath founded Horwath & Horwath in New York. The original practice focused on the hospitality industry. The practice later expanded to include accounting, audit and tax offerings. In 1967, it merged with Laventhol Krekstein Griffith & Co. to become Laventhol & Horwath.

Crowe Chizek was established in 1942 in South Bend, Indiana, by Fred P. Crowe Sr. and Cletus F. Chizek. Previously, Crowe had worked in public accounting for many years and also served as the St. Joseph County auditor for eight years. Chizek was head of the accounting department at the University of Notre Dame and also worked part-time in public accounting. Following the death of Fred P. Crowe Sr. in 1952, Cletus F. Chizek reorganized the firm as Crowe, Chizek and Company and two firm personnel, M. Mendel Piser and Fred P. Crowe Jr., became partners. The first legal partnership of Crowe Chizek and Company was formulated in 1962 with six founding partners: Cletus F. Chizek, M. Mendel Piser, Fred P. Crowe Jr., Robert W. Green, Joseph A. Bauters and John J. Pairitz.

By 1960, the umbrella organization Horwath & Horwath International Associates (HHIA) was established.

In 1989, the organization shortened its name to Horwath International  and in 1991 Crowe Chizek became a member of the network.

Horwath International rebranded in April 2009, as Crowe Horwath International and in June 2018, Crowe Horwath sees a further evolution of their brand with a move to the network name 'Crowe' across their independent member firms globally.

Organization 
David Mellor, the current CEO of Crowe Global, succeeded former CEO Kevin McGrath in April 2018. In June 2018, the global network rebranded and changed its name to Crowe. Over 220 member firms across the world are now known under the new single name.

See also 

 Accounting networks and associations
 Big Four accounting firms
 Professional services
 Financial audit
 Tax advisor

References

Further reading 

1915 establishments in New York City
1915 establishments in the United States
Accounting firms of the United States
Companies based in New York City
Consulting firms established in 1915
International management consulting firms
Management consulting firms of the United Kingdom
Management consulting firms of the United States